Alexander Bunbury (born 18 June 1967) is a Canadian former professional soccer player who played as a striker.

He played mainly for Marítimo in Portugal during a 13-year professional career, and represented the Canadian national team during 11 years.
In 2000, Bunbury became a manager.

Club career
Born in Plaisance, Guyana, Bunbury started playing professionally with the Hamilton Steelers where he was managed by John Charles, also having one-year spells in the Canadian Soccer League with the Toronto Blizzard and Montreal Supra.

In 1993, after an unassuming season for West Ham United (only six appearances overall), he moved to Portugal's C.S. Marítimo, going on to become the club's all-time leading goalscorer in the Primeira Liga with 59 goals. In his second season, he won the Foreign Player of the Year award, and he scored a career-best 15 goals in the 1998–99 campaign, helping his team to the tenth position in what was his final year in Madeira.

In early 1999, after requesting a move to play closer to his hometown of Montreal, Bunbury returned to North America, and retired after two seasons with the Kansas City Wizards of Major League Soccer. Subsequently, he took up coaching, first with Bangu FC then at the Minnesota Thunder Academy.

Bunbury was inducted into the Canadian Soccer Hall of Fame in April 2006. In 2012, as part of the Canadian Soccer Association's centennial celebration, he was named to the all-time Canada XI men's team.

International career
Bunbury played in all three of Canada's games at the 1985 FIFA World Youth Championship in the Soviet Union. He made his debut with the senior side in an August 1986 Merlion Cup match against Singapore, and went on to earn 65 caps and score 15 goals during 11 years.

Bunbury ranked fourth in the all-time scorer's list in June 2008, and eighth in appearances. He represented the nation in 30 FIFA World Cup qualifiers, and played at the inaugural 1989 FIFA Futsal World Championship.

Bunbury's final international was a November 1997 World Cup qualification match against Costa Rica, a game after which Paul Dolan, Geoff Aunger, Frank Yallop and Colin Miller also said farewell to the national team.

International goals
Scores and results list Canada's goal tally first.

Personal life
After his retirement, Bunbury made Prior Lake, Minnesota, his home, where he worked as a youth soccer coach and trainer. He has four children with his ex-wife Kristi: actress Kylie, professional soccer players Teal and Mataeo, and Logan.

Honours
Marítimo
Taça de Portugal: runner-up 1994–95

Kansas City Wizards
MLS Cup: 2000
MLS Supporters' Shield: 2000

Individual
Canadian International Player of the Year: 1993, 1995
Primeira Liga: Foreign Player of the Year 1994–95

References

External links
  / Canada Soccer Hall of Fame
 
 The Wonderful World of West Ham United statistics
 

1967 births
Living people
People from Demerara-Mahaica
Guyanese emigrants to Canada
Naturalized citizens of Canada
Soccer players from Hamilton, Ontario
Soccer players from Montreal
Anglophone Quebec people
Black Canadian soccer players
Afro-Guyanese people
Canadian soccer players
Association football forwards
Canadian Soccer League (1987–1992) players
Hamilton Steelers (1981–1992) players
Montreal Supra players
Toronto Blizzard (1986–1993) players
English Football League players
West Ham United F.C. players
Primeira Liga players
C.S. Marítimo players
Major League Soccer players
Sporting Kansas City players
Canada men's youth international soccer players
Canada men's international soccer players
1993 CONCACAF Gold Cup players
1996 CONCACAF Gold Cup players
Canadian expatriate soccer players
Expatriate footballers in England
Expatriate footballers in Portugal
Expatriate soccer players in the United States
Canadian expatriate sportspeople in Portugal
Canada Soccer Hall of Fame inductees
Canadian men's futsal players
Canadian expatriate sportspeople in England
Canadian expatriate sportspeople in the United States